Google Pinyin IME was an input method developed by Google China Labs. The tool was made publicly available on April 4, 2007. Aside from Pinyin input, it also includes stroke count method input.  As of March 2019, Google Pinyin has been discontinued and the download page  has been deleted. However, Google Pinyin IME can still be obtained from https://dl.google.com/pinyin/v2/GooglePinyinInstaller.exe.

Availability

Windows 
, Google Pinyin was available for Windows XP, Windows Vista, Windows 7, Windows 8 & Windows 10 version 1511 or below. Both 32-bit and 64-bit versions were available.

Android 
Google released a Pinyin IME system for Android 1.5 or newer in March 2009. The Android Pinyin IME supports user dictionary synchronization with the desktop version.

Linux 
By the end of 2008, more than 20% users of Google Pinyin wanted a Linux version of the input method, which was answered in the FAQ section with a general PR phrase "We always strive to provide a better user experience and we never stop our hard work to fulfill the customer needs".

However, the Linux user community is porting the Android Google Pinyin IME to the non-Android Linux IME framework SCIM in the scim-googlepinyin module.

After Christmas 2009, the Google pinyin module for SCIM became also available for the Nokia Maemo 5 platform, which meant it could be downloaded to any Nokia N900 phone through the official application repositories.

Mac OS X 
A closed beta version of Google Pinyin for Mac OS X was leaked on September 14, 2010. A public version was never made available.

Copyright infringement allegations 

After Google Pinyin was initially released in April 2007, it was soon discovered that Google Pinyin's dictionary database contained employee names of Sogou Pinyin, an indication that the dictionary was taken from Sogou, one of Google's competitors in the Chinese Internet market. On April 8, 2007, Google admitted that they used "non-Google database resources". Shortly thereafter, a new version of Google Pinyin was released which no longer appeared to be based on Sogou's database.

Synchronization failure

Google Pinyin for Windows has been failing to synchronize for years because of the deprecation of Google ClientLogin authentication. A client with an alternative authentication method has not been announced yet. Google Pinyin for Android can still synchronize (within this platform only).

See also 
Pinyin input method
Google IME
Google Japanese Input
Microsoft Pinyin IME
Sogou Pinyin

References

External links 
 Google Pinyin Website
 Official Google Group (Old)
 Version History

Pinyin
Han character input
Freeware
Windows text-related software
Android (operating system) software
Pinyin
Han pinyin input